Hibbertia carinata is a species of flowering plant in the family Dilleniaceae and is endemic to the south-west of Western Australia. It is a shrub with crowded linear leaves and yellow flowers with nine to eleven stamens fused at their bases on one side of the two densely hairy carpels.

Description
There are nine to eleven stamens, fused at the base and all on one side of the two densely hairy carpels that each contain four ovules. Flowering has been recorded in August and September.

Taxonomy
Hibbertia carinata was first formally described in 2000 by Judith R. Wheeler in the journal Nuytsia from specimens collected at Hatter Hill in 1996. The specific epithet (carinata) means "keeled", referring to sepals.

Distribution and habitat
This hibbertia has a scattered distribution through the southern Wheatbelt and a small parts of the Goldfields-Esperance region of Western Australia between Lake Grace in the west and  Esperance in the east where it is found growing in well-drained gravelly sandy soils.

Conservation status
Hibbertia carinata is classified as "Priority One" by the Government of Western Australia Department of Parks and Wildlife, meaning that it is known from only one or a few locations which are potentially at risk.

See also
List of Hibbertia species

References

carinata
Flora of Western Australia
Plants described in 2000